Sherlock Holmes Faces Death is the sixth film in the Basil Rathbone/Nigel Bruce series of Sherlock Holmes films. Made in 1943, it is a loose adaptation of Sir Arthur Conan Doyle's Holmes 1893 story "The Adventure of the Musgrave Ritual." Its three immediate predecessors in the film series were World War II spy adventures with Holmes and Dr. Watson assisting working to thwart enemy agents, but this one marked a return to the pure mystery film form. Though several characters are military men and there are frequent mentions of the ongoing war, it is not the focus of the story.

This was the second of three Holmes films in which Basil Rathbone, Nigel Bruce and Hillary Brooke appeared together. The first was Sherlock Holmes and the Voice of Terror in 1942 and the third was The Woman in Green in 1945.

Plot
Dr. Watson is serving as resident physician at Musgrave Manor in Northumberland, a stately home which is also used as a hospital for a number of servicemen suffering from shell shock.

When Sally Musgrave displays her feelings for one of the wounded American fighter pilots, Captain Pat Vickery, who is currently recovering at the family estate, her brothers Geoffrey and Phillip are quick to show their dismay.

Then one of the physicians working at the estate, Dr. Sexton, is assaulted by an unknown assailant when out on a walk. Dr. John Watson, who is in charge of the medical facility, goes to fetch his dear friend Sherlock Holmes to bring some clarity to the case of the attack.

Upon his arrival at the estate, Sherlock Holmes discovers the dead body of one of the brothers, Geoffrey. Inspector Lestrade of Scotland Yard is put on the case to solve the murder, and immediately arrests the American captain as a suspect.

Holmes is of another opinion about the flyer's guilt and continues to investigate on his own.  Phillip is formally made the new head of the estate the next day with the aid of his sister. But after only one day of running the estate, Phillip, too, is found murdered, lying in the trunk of the car.

Lestrade suspects the family butler, Alfred Brunton, to be the murderer because Phillip had just fired the butler. Trying to arrest the butler, Lestrade gets lost in the manor's secret passageways. Meanwhile, Holmes and Watson look into the special "Musgrave Ritual" that the family uses to appoint the new head of the family. They find the words used in the ritual hidden in Sally's room and try to copy the ritual, which involves replaying a giant chess game on the checkered floor of the house main hall. As pieces in the game they use the household staff.

The game gives them clues to the family's secret burial crypt underneath the house, and there they find Brunton murdered, clutching a case containing an old document. Holmes examines the body for clues and sets a trap for the murderer. After the others have retired for the day, Holmes sneaks back into the crypt and waits for the murderer to reappear. Before long, Sexton appears, where Holmes confronts him with the evidence that he has found and observed throughout the investigation. Sexton, however, manages to overpower Holmes and takes his revolver. Then Sexton confesses that he indeed is the one responsible for the murders. He shoots at Holmes with what turn out to be blank cartridges. When Sexton emerges from the crypt, Lestrade and Watson are there waiting to arrest him.

Explaining the meaning of the document found in the crypt to Sally, Holmes suggests that Sexton had discovered an old land grant that entitled the Musgraves to a fortune of millions of pounds, and had hatched a deadly scheme to gain it for himself. The devious doctor had killed both brothers, making Sally heir to the money, and then sought to claim her as his bride by framing her sweetheart, Vickey, for the slayings. Learning of this, Sally destroys the document that would have made her rich, not wanting to profit at the cost of others' lives.

Driving away with Watson, Holmes muses on Sally's selfless act:

There’s a new spirit abroad in the land. The old days of grab and greed are on their way out. We’re beginning to think of what we owe the other fellow, not just what we’re compelled to give him. The time’s coming, Watson, when we shan’t be able to fill our bellies in comfort while other folk go hungry, or sleep in warm beds while others shiver in the cold; when we shan’t be able to kneel and thank God for blessings before our shining altars while men anywhere are kneeling in either physical or spiritual subjection.... And God willing, we’ll live to see that day, Watson.

Cast
 Basil Rathbone as Sherlock Holmes
 Nigel Bruce as Dr. John Watson
 Dennis Hoey as Inspector Lestrade
 Arthur Margetson as Dr. Bob Sexton
 Hillary Brooke as Sally Musgrave
 Halliwell Hobbes as Alfred Brunton
 Minna Phillips as Mrs. Howells
 Milburn Stone as Captain Vickery
 Frederick Worlock as Geoffrey Musgrave
 Gavin Muir as Phillip Musgrave
 Gerald Hamer as Major Langford
 Vernon Downing as Lt. Clavering
 Olaf Hytten as Captain MacIntosh
 Charles Coleman as Constable Kray
 Dick Rush as Constable 
 Mary Gordon as Mrs. Hudson
 Peter Lawford as Customer in Public House (uncredited)
 Norma Varden as Gracie the barmaid (uncredited)

References

External links 
 
 
 
 

1943 films
1943 mystery films
American mystery films
American detective films
1943 crime films
Films based on short fiction
Sherlock Holmes films based on works by Arthur Conan Doyle
American black-and-white films
Universal Pictures films
Films directed by Roy William Neill
Films set in England
Films set in London
Films set in Northumberland
Films set in country houses
Films set on the home front during World War II
1940s English-language films
1940s American films